FC Armavir is a defunct football club from Armavir, Armavir Province, Armenia. It was founded in 1965 as FC Sevan Hoktemberyan. After the collapse of the Soviet Union, FC Armavir participated in the Armenian Leagues mainly throughout the 1990s. However, the club was dissolved in 2003, and is currently away from professional football.

Name changes
1965–1981: FC Sevan Hoktemberyan
1981–1990: FC Spartak Hoktemberyan
1990–1995: FC Araks Armavir
1995–2001: FC Armavir
2001–2002: FC Karmrakhayt Armavir
2002–2003: FC Armavir

External links

 RSSSF Armenia (and subpages per year)

 
Association football clubs established in 1965
Association football clubs disestablished in 2003
Armavir
1965 establishments in Armenia
2003 disestablishments in Armenia